The Honda Vamos is a leisure vehicle originally produced by Japanese automaker Honda from 1970 to 1973, and reintroduced again as a trim level of the Honda Acty microvan starting in 1999. Its name, "Vamos", is Spanish language for "let's go".

1970-1973 

Available as a kei truck, it was based on the Honda TN360. The Vamos used a 354 cc 2-cylinder, mid mounted, air-cooled, overhead camshaft gasoline engine shared with the Honda TN360, N360, and the Z360. The Vamos was a competitor at the time to the Suzuki Jimny and the Daihatsu Fellow buggy. According to the article for this vehicle at Japanese Wikipedia, only 2,500 were sold. Honda had hoped the popularity of the Honda Dax minibike with its off-road image would be associated with the Vamos. Because of the installation of the spare tire on the front of the vehicle and the sound from the air-cooled engine, it had a Volkswagen Type 2 reputation but because of the open cabin design, it wasn't very popular due to a lack of four-wheel drive.

The Vamos was available with an optional and removable rear seat, whereas the Vamos was known as the Vamos 2 or the Vamos 4, for its ability of passenger capacity. It was also available with lap only seat belts for all passengers. The convertible top was easily and quickly removed as needed. Due to the open cab configuration, all instrumentation and switches were both water- and dust proof. It used a MacPherson strut front suspension and a De Dion tube with half leaf springs in the back.

Vamos & Vamos Hobio 

The Honda Vamos name was reintroduced in June 1999, and was joined by its twin, the Honda Vamos Hobio in April 2003. Both are microvans with 659 cc straight-3 SOHC E07Z gasoline engines and are upper trim level versions of the Honda Acty van. Four-wheel drive is optional, using Honda's Full Time 4WD system that utilizes a viscous coupling. It features independent suspension with front coil springs and rear leaf springs.

The Vamos is marketed more for personal use whereas the Acty van and truck are geared more towards commercial and industrial uses, and as delivery vehicles. The Vamos has a redesigned rear end, with vertical rather than horizontal taillights and a smaller rear gate. Most of the luxury equipment offered on the Vamos is not available on the Acty. The Vamos competes with the Suzuki Every van, the Subaru Sambar van and the Daihatsu Atrai van in Japan. The 2003 Vamos Hobio is a "recreational" vehicle, meant to be used as part of an active lifestyle. It has a roof which is  taller and has the Acty Van's bigger tailgate and low-mounted taillights. The interior features numerous hooks and mounting points on the floor and walls and has water proof trim. The Vamos Hobio also has a different front design with a more prominent, trapezoidal grille.

Various trim packages and unique options have been offered on the Vamos and Vamos Hobio, with almost yearly cosmetic changes to items like grille, tail lights and color combinations. The interior seats are configurable into multiple positions to maximize its load-carrying and passenger accommodation. From May until October 2003 Honda also accepted orders for the Vamos Hobio "Travel Dog Package," especially designed to accommodate dogs. This offered water-repellant and deodorant upholstery, pet mats, and other special equipment. In May 2007 a Travel Dog Package was again offered, this time on the regular Vamos. This package remained available to order until the end of January 2008.

Aftermarket appearance kits are available in Japan.

Production of the Vamos and Vamos Hobio was discontinued on May 21, 2018 as the car could not meet new crash safety standards without extensive reengineering. The Vamos was replaced by the N-Van, although scattered examples of existing stock continued to be sold until the final Vamos Hobio Pro was sold in October 2019.

References

External links 

 VAMOS Official Page
 ThisOldHonda.org
 Folding Top Demonstration Video at honda.co.jp 

Vamos
Pickup trucks
Microvans
Rear-wheel-drive vehicles
Kei trucks
Hatchbacks